Martin Schottenloher is a German mathematician.

Life 

He was born on July 25, 1944 in Lindau, Germany.

He specializes in algorithms, artificial intelligence and complex analysis.

Career 

He completed his Dr. rer. nat. degree at the Ludwig Maximilian University of Munich in 1972. His doctoral supervisors were Walter Roelcke and Karl Stein. He received his habilitation in 1975, also from the University of Munich.

At the Ludwig Maximilian University of Munich, he has supervised the doctoral dissertations of more than a dozen students:

Bibliography 

Some of his books and papers are:

References

External links
 

Year of birth missing (living people)
Living people
20th-century German mathematicians
Ludwig Maximilian University of Munich alumni
21st-century German mathematicians